The Auschwitz-Birkenau State Museum is a museum on the site of the Auschwitz concentration camp in Oświęcim (German: Auschwitz), Poland.

The site includes the main concentration camp at Auschwitz I and the remains of the concentration and extermination camp at Auschwitz II-Birkenau. Both were developed and run by Nazi Germany during its occupation of Poland in 1939–1945. The Polish government has preserved the site as a research centre and in memory of the 1.1 million people who died there, including 960,000 Jews, during World War II and the Holocaust. It became a World Heritage Site in 1979. Piotr Cywiński is the museum's director.

Overview 

The museum was created in April 1946 by Tadeusz Wąsowicz and other former Auschwitz prisoners, acting under the direction of Poland's Ministry of Culture and Art. It was formally founded on 2 July 1947 by an act of the Polish parliament. The site consists of 20 hectares in Auschwitz I and 171 hectares in Auschwitz II, which lies about three kilometres from the main camp. Over 25 million people have visited the museum. From 1955 to 1990, the museum was directed by one of its founders and former inmates, Kazimierz Smoleń.

In 2019, 2,320,000 people visited the site, including visitors from Poland (at least 396,000), United Kingdom (200,000), United States (120,000), Italy (104,000), Germany (73,000), Spain (70,000), France (67,000), Israel (59,000), Ireland (42,000), and Sweden (40,000).

History 

The first exhibition in the barracks opened in 1947. In Stalinist Poland, on the seventh anniversary of the first deportation of Polish captives to Auschwitz, the exhibition was revised with the assistance of former inmates. The exhibition was influenced by the Cold War and next to pictures of Jewish ghettos, photos of slums in the US were presented. After Stalin's death, a new exhibition was planned in 1955. In 1959, every nation that had victims in Auschwitz received the right to present its own exhibition. However, victims like homosexuals, Jehovah's Witnesses, Sinti and Roma, and Yeniche people did not receive these rights. The state of Israel was also refused the allowance for its own exhibition as the murdered Jews in Auschwitz were not citizens of Israel. In April 1968, the Jewish exhibition, designed by Andrzej Szczypiorski, was opened. In 1979, Pope John Paul II held a mass in Birkenau and called the camp a "Golgotha of our times".

In 1962, a prevention zone around the museum in Birkenau (and in 1977, one around the museum in Auschwitz) was established to maintain the historical condition of the camp. These zones were confirmed by the Polish parliament in 1999. In 1967, the first big memorial monument was inaugurated and in the 1990s the first information boards were set up.

National exhibitions 

Since 1960, the so-called "national exhibitions" have been located in Auschwitz I. Most of them were renewed from time to time; for example, those of Belgium, France, Hungary, Netherlands, Slovakia, Czech Republic, and the former Soviet Union. The German exhibition, which was made by the former GDR, has not been renewed.

The first national exhibition of the Soviet Union was opened in 1961 and renewed in 1977 and 1985. In 2003, the Russian organizing committee suggested presenting a completely new exhibition. The Soviet part of the museum was closed, but the reopening was delayed as there were differences in the questions of the territorial situation of the Soviet Union between 1939 and 1941. The question of the territories annexed by the USSR during the war, i.e. the  Baltic countries, eastern Poland, and Moldova could not be solved. Yugoslav pavilion and exhibition, which memorialized Auschwitz victims primarily through their antifascist struggle, was opened in 1963. In 2002, Croatia, as one of Yugoslav successor states, notified the Auschwitz Memorial Museum that it wanted the Yugoslav exhibition dismantled and demanded permission to establish its own national exhibition. The museum rejected the proposal and notified all Yugoslav successor states that only a renovated joint exhibit would be appropriate. Since they failed to create a joint exhibition, the Yugoslav exhibition was closed down in 2009 and its contents were sent the Museum of Yugoslavia in Belgrade, while Block 17, which hosted the exhibition, remains empty.

In 1978, Austria opened its own exhibition, presenting itself as a victim of National Socialism. This one-sided view motivated the Austrian political scientist Andreas Maislinger to work in the museum within the Action Reconciliation Service for Peace in 1980/81. Later he founded the Austrian Holocaust Memorial Service. The Austrian federal president Rudolf Kirchschläger had advised Maislinger that as a young Austrian he did not need to atone for anything in Auschwitz. Due to this disapproving attitude of the official Austrian representation, the Austrian Holocaust Memorial Service could not be launched before September 1992.

Filming 
The museum has allowed scenes for four films to be filmed on the site: Pasażerka (1963) by Polish director Andrzej Munk, Landscape After the Battle (1970) by Polish director Andrzej Wajda, and a television miniseries, War and Remembrance (1988), and Denial (2016).  Although the Polish government permitted the construction of film sets on its grounds to shoot scenes for Schindler's List (1993), Steven Spielberg chose to build a "replica" camp entrance outside the infamous archway for the scene in which the train arrives carrying the women who were saved by Oskar Schindler.

Religious disputes

In 1979, the newly elected Polish Pope John Paul II celebrated mass on the grounds of Auschwitz II to some 500,000 people, and announced that Edith Stein would be beatified. Some Catholics erected a cross near Bunker 2 of Auschwitz II where she had been gassed. A short while later, a Star of David appeared at the site, leading to a proliferation of religious symbols, which were eventually removed.

Carmelite nuns opened a convent near Auschwitz I in 1984. After some Jewish groups called for the removal of the convent, representatives of the Catholic Church agreed in 1987. One year later, the Carmelites erected an 8 m (26 ft) tall cross from the 1979 mass near their site, just outside Block 11 and barely visible from within the camp. This led to protests by Jewish groups, who said that mostly Jews were killed at Auschwitz and demanded that religious symbols be kept away from the site. The Catholic Church told the Carmelites to move by 1989, but they stayed on until 1993, leaving the cross behind. In 1998, after further calls to remove the cross, some 300 smaller crosses were erected by local activists near the large one, leading to further protests and heated exchanges. Following an agreement between the Polish Catholic Church and the Polish government, the smaller crosses were removed in 1999, but a large papal one remains.

Liberation-day anniversaries
The 50th anniversary of the liberation ceremony was held in Auschwitz I in 1995. About a thousand ex-prisoners attended it. In 1996, Germany made January 27, the day of the liberation of Auschwitz, the official day for the commemoration of the victims of National Socialism. Countries that have also adopted similar memorial days include Denmark (Auschwitz Day), Italy (Memorial Day), and Poland (Memorial Day for the Victims of Nazism).
A commemoration was held for the 70th anniversary of the liberation in 2015.

Visiting the museum

The larger part of the exhibitions are in the area of the former camp at Auschwitz I. Guided tours take around three hours, but access is possible without guides from 16 to 18:00 (as of 2019). This part is situated short of 2 km south of the train station at Oświęcim. From there, shuttle buses go to Auschwitz II, originally called KL Auschwitz-Birkenau, situated around 2 km to the north-west of Auschwitz I. As of 2019, trains from Vienna to Kraków, and from Prague to Krakow, stop at Oświęcim, where local trains from Katowice (around every one to two hours) from Krakow end. Local trains take around 100 minutes from Kraków.

UNESCO name change

The Polish Foreign Ministry has voiced objections to the use of the expression "Polish death camp" in relation to Auschwitz, in case the phrase suggested that Poland rather than Germany had perpetrated the Holocaust. In June 2007, the United Nations World Heritage Committee changed its own name for the site from "Auschwitz Concentration Camp" to "Auschwitz Birkenau", with the subtitle "German Nazi Concentration and Extermination Camp (1940–1945)".

Recent events

Arbeit macht frei sign theft

Early in the morning on 18 December 2009, the Arbeit macht frei ("work makes you free") sign over the gate of Auschwitz I was stolen. Police found the sign hidden in a forest outside Gdańsk two days later. The theft was organised by a Swedish former neo-Nazi, Anders Högström, who reportedly hoped to use proceeds from the sale of the sign to a collector of Nazi memorabilia to finance a series of terror attacks aimed at influencing voters in upcoming Swedish parliamentary elections. Högström was convicted in Poland and sentenced to serve two years, eight months in a Swedish prison, and five Polish men who had acted on his behalf served prison time in Poland.

Högström and his accomplices badly damaged the sign during the theft, cutting it into three pieces. Conservationists restored the sign to its original condition, and it currently is in storage, awaiting eventual display inside the museum. A replica hangs in its original place.

Iranian visit denied
In February 2006, Poland refused to grant visas to Iranian researchers who were planning to visit Auschwitz. Polish Foreign Minister Stefan Meller said his country should stop Iran from investigating the scale of the Holocaust, which Iranian President Mahmoud Ahmadinejad has dismissed as a myth. Iran has recently tried to leave the Ahmadinejad rhetoric in the past, but President Rouhani has never repudiated his predecessor's idea that the scale of the Holocaust is exaggerated. Holocaust denial is punishable in Poland by a prison sentence of up to three years.

Art purchases
Czechoslovakian Jew Dina Babbitt imprisoned at Auschwitz-Birkenau in 1943–1945 painted a dozen portraits of Romani inmates for the war criminal Josef Mengele during his medical experiments. Seven of the original 12 studies were discovered after the Holocaust and purchased by the Auschwitz-Birkenau State Museum in 1963 from an Auschwitz survivor. The museum asked Babbitt to return to Poland in 1973 to identify her work. She did so but also requested that the museum allow her to take her paintings home with her. Officials from the museum led by Rabbi Andrew Baker stated that the portraits belonged to the SS and Mengele, who died in Brazil in 1979. There was an initiative to have the museum return the portraits in 1999, headed by the U.S. government petitioned by Rafael Medoff and 450 American comic book artists. The museum rejected these claims as legally groundless.

See also
 Majdanek State Museum
 International Youth Meeting Center in Oświęcim/Auschwitz

References

External links

World Cultural Heritage UNESCO-description
Article on visiting Auschwitz-Birkenau Museum
Google Earth view of the museum entrance

Holocaust museums
Museums established in 1947
World Heritage Sites in Poland
Oświęcim County
World War II museums in Poland
Museums in Lesser Poland Voivodeship
1947 establishments in Poland
Commanders with Star of the Order of Polonia Restituta
Recipients of the Gold Medal for Merit to Culture – Gloria Artis
Auschwitz concentration camp